Scot(t) Thompson may refer to:

Sportspeople
 Scott Thompson (footballer, born 1983), Australian rules footballer who played for Melbourne and Adelaide
 Scott Thompson (footballer, born 1986), Australian rules footballer, currently playing for North Melbourne
 Scott Thompson (cricketer) (born 1972), Australian cricketer
 Scot Thompson (baseball) (born 1955), baseball outfielder
 Scott Thompson (basketball player), American basketball player
 Scott Thompson (wrestler), wrestler known as Krusher Kong
 Scott Thompson (basketball coach), American college basketball coach
 Scot Thompson (born 1981), American soccer player

Others
 Scott Thompson (comedian) (born 1959), Canadian actor and comedian
 Scott Thompson (businessman) (born 1957), former CEO of Yahoo! and former president of PayPal
 Scott Thompson (musician), American musician
 Carrot Top (Scott Thompson, born 1965), American comedian

See also
 Scott Thomson (disambiguation)